Khlestov is a Russian surname. Notable people with the surname include:

Dmitri Khlestov (born 1971), Russian football player
Oleg Khlestov (1923–2021), Soviet and Russian diplomat and legal academic

Russian-language surnames